HD 120084 is a star in the constellation of Ursa Minor. With an apparent magnitude of 5.91, it is just visible to the naked eye in suburban skies.

It is a yellow giant of spectral type G7III and surface temperature of around 4892 K, around 2.4 times the mass, 43 times the luminosity and 9 times the radius of the Sun. There is one planet known to orbit this star.

Planetary system
A planet with at least 4.5 times the mass of Jupiter and a highly eccentric orbit (with an eccentricity of 0.66) was discovered by precisely measuring the radial velocity of the star in 2013. With an average distance of 4.5 AU from its star, this planet has one of the most eccentric orbits discovered. In 2022, the inclination and true mass of HD 120084 b were measured via astrometry.

References

G-type giants
Durchmusterung objects
120084
066903
Ursa Minor (constellation)
Planetary systems with one confirmed planet